Yang Xianrong (羊獻容) (died 13 May 322), posthumous name (as honored by Han Zhao) Empress Xianwen (獻文皇后, literally "the wise and civil empress"), was an empress—uniquely in the history of China, for two different dynastic empires and two different emperors. Her first husband was Emperor Hui of Jin, and her second husband was Liu Yao of Han Zhao. Also unique was the fact that she was deposed four times and restored four times as empress of the Western Jin (five, if one counts the brief usurpation by Sima Lun against her husband in 301).

As empress of Jin 
Yang Xianrong was from Taishan Commandery (roughly modern Tai'an, Shandong).  Her father was the mid-level official Yang Xuanzhi (羊玄之), son of Yang Jin (羊瑾), son of Yang Dan (羊耽); Yang Jin was also the elder brother of Yang Xiu (羊琇). Her maternal grandfather was the general Sun Qi (孫旂), a distant relative of Sun Xiu (孫秀), the chief strategist for Sima Lun the Prince of Zhao.  Therefore, after Sima Lun and Sun overthrew Empress Jia Nanfeng in 300, Sun had Yang Xianrong selected as the new empress.  Little is known about how her relationship with her developmentally disabled husband (save her words to her second husband, referred to below) was.  After Sima Lun briefly usurped the throne in 301 but was then defeated by Sima Jiong the Prince of Qi and Sima Ying the Prince of Chengdu, both Sun Xiu and Sun Qi were killed, along with their clans.  Empress Yang's father Yang Xuanzhi was, however, promoted.  (He would die in fear in 303, however, as his friendship with Sima Ai the Prince of Changsha was used as an excuse for Sima Ying and Sima Yong the Prince of Hejian to attack Sima Ai.)

As Emperor Hui continued to be a pawn of the princes during the War of the Eight Princes, Empress Yang herself appeared to have had little influence.  She was, however, frequently used as an excuse for certain conspirators' actions, and during the span from 304 to 306 she was deposed four times and restored four times, often in conjunction with her husband's nephew Sima Qin (司馬覃)'s fortunes as crown prince.  She was nearly killed after her fourth removal in 305, as Sima Yong, then holding Emperor Hui at Chang'an and leaving her in the capital Luoyang, became convinced that she was easily usable by his opponents as a rubber stamp, and so he ordered that she be forced to commit suicide.  The governor of the capital region, Liu Tun (劉暾) offered a petition to save her life, which nearly cost him his own—as Sima Yong ordered to have him arrested, and he was barely able to flee with his life.  However, after Liu's intercession, for whatever reason, Sima Yong cancelled the order to have her forced to commit suicide.

In 306, as the War of the Eight Princes neared its end and Emperor Hui was allowed to return to Luoyang after Sima Yue the Prince of Donghai defeated Sima Yong, he welcomed Yang back as his empress.  In early 307, however, he was poisoned to death.  (Most historians believe that Sima Yue was behind the poisoning, but there is no conclusive evidence.)  The recognized heir was Emperor Hui's brother, Sima Chi the crown prince, but Empress Yang, believing that she would not be honored as empress dowager if her brother-in-law inherited the throne, tried to have Sima Qin declared emperor; she was rebuffed by Sima Yue, however, and Crown Prince Chi succeeded to the throne as Emperor Huai.  (Her attempt might have cost Prince Qin his life, as Sima Yue had him executed in 308.)  Emperor Huai honored her with the title "Empress Hui," but not empress dowager.

Empress Yang's influence or lack thereof during Emperor Huai's reign was unclear, but since Emperor Huai himself did not have much power (with Sima Yue still holding onto much the power), it was not likely that Empress Yang had significant influence.  After Sima Yue's death in 311, the Jin armies were in shambles and unable to protect Luoyang any further.  Luoyang soon fell to Han Zhao's armies, led by the generals Huyan Yan, Wang Mi, Shi Le, and Liu Yao the Prince of Shi'an.  Liu Yao burnt most of Luoyang and executed a large number of Jin officials, but did not kill Empress Yang; instead, he took her as his own wife.

As empress of Han Zhao 
Little is known about Yang Xianrong's life with Liu Yao, other than that she was favored by him and bore him three sons — Liu Xī, Liu Xí (劉襲, note different tone), and Liu Chan (劉闡).  (It was not clear whether she was his wife or concubine by this point — Liu Yao had an earlier wife, Princess Bu, who was described as having died and having been princess when her son Liu Yin was created the Prince of Yong'an in 323.)  Liu Yao, as the trusted cousin of the Han Zhao emperor Liu Cong, had many military responsibilities and was in charge of the Chang'an region after he captured it and Emperor Huai's successor Emperor Min in 316.  In 318, after the Han Zhao prime minister Jin Zhun massacred the Han Zhao imperial family and nobles in the capital Pingyang (平陽, in modern Linfen, Shanxi) after a coup, the officials who fled from the massacre offered the throne to Liu Yao, who accepted.  After his and Shi Le's forces defeated Jin's, he moved the capital to Chang'an.  In 319, he created Yang Xianrong his empress and her son Liu Xī crown prince.  Once, Liu Yao asked her: "How do I compare to the Sima man?"  Her response was:

How can there be a comparison?  Your Imperial Majesty is an empire-building intelligent ruler, while he was an idiot who destroyed his empire.  He only had one wife and one son and could protect neither.  He was an honored emperor, but he allowed his wife and son to be dishonored at the hands of commoners.  At that time, all I wanted was death, and I did not know that I would have today.  I was born from a noble family, but I thought that all men were like he.  Only after I married you have I found out what a true man is like.

Liu Yao greatly favored her, and she was involved in governmental matters.  She died in 322.  Her son Liu Xī would continue to be crown prince, but both Liu Yao and Liu Xī were killed by Shi Le's Later Zhao forces after Han Zhao fell to Later Zhao in 329.

References 

 Book of Jin, vols. 31, 103.
 Zizhi Tongjian, vols. 83, 85, 86, 87, 91, 92.

|- style="text-align: center;"

|-

|-

|-

|- style="text-align: center;"

|-

|-

3rd-century births
322 deaths
Jin dynasty (266–420) empresses
Former Zhao empresses
3rd-century Chinese women
4th-century Chinese women
3rd-century Chinese people
4th-century Chinese people
Remarried royal consorts